Western Equatoria is a  state in South Sudan. Its capital is Yambio. The state was divided into counties, each headed by a County Commissioner. Western Equatoria seceded from Sudan as part of the Republic of South Sudan on 9 July 1956. On October 2, 2011, the state was divided into Amadi, Maridi, and Gbudwe states, and Tambura State was split from Gbudwe state on January 14, 2015. Western Equatoria was re-established by a peace agreement signed on 22 February 2020.

History 
Since the 16th century, Western Equatoria has been a home to the Avukaya, Azande, Baka, Moru, Mundu and Balanda.

The Mahdist Revolt of the 1880s destabilized the nascent province, and Equatoria ceased to exist as an Egyptian outpost in 1889. Important settlements in Equatoria included Lado, Gondokoro, Dufile and Wadelai. European colonial maneuverings in the region came to a head in 1898, when the Fashoda Incident occurred at present-day Kodok; Britain and France almost went to war over the region.[21] In 1947, British hopes to join South Sudan with Uganda, while leaving Western Equatoria as part of Belgian Congo were dashed by the Juba Conference to unify North and South Sudan.

In the middle of the twentieth century, after Sudan's independence in 1956, Western Equatorians sacrificed their life for over 5 decades liberating in movements for the independence of South Sudanese, including the Anya Nya led by, Joseph Lagu and the Sudan People's Liberation Army/Movement (SPLA/M), led by John Garang de Mabior, as they envisioned of New Sudan. Western Equatoria was also known as the breadbasket state for liberators during both civil wars.

Western Equatoria was separated from its sister state of Eastern Equatoria, becoming a province in 1976 and the two Equatoria provinces were once again inaugurated into 3 statehoods of Western Equatoria, Central Equatoria and Eastern Equatoria in the midst of the 1990s. Hence, there was a plan to re-unify the 3 sister states back into regions after the implementation of South Sudan's federal system. But many suggested the three states should remain in place with each governor, while having a governor general to oversee the Greater Equatoria region.

Counties 
There are 10 counties in Western Equatoria:
 Yambio County Capital: Yambio
 Nzara County Capital: Nzara
 Ibba County Capital: Ibba
 Ezo County Capital: Ezo
 Maridi County Capital: Maridi
 Tambura County Capital: Tumbura
 Mundri West County Capital: Mundri
 Mvolo County Capital: Mvolo
 Nagero County Capital: Nagero
 Mundri East County Capital: Kedi'ba
Other important towns in Western Equatoria were: Nagero, Duma, Namutina, Jambo, Rasul, Lui, Tore, Muroko, Manguo, Mambe, Kotobi, Yarri, Farak Sika, Madebe, Bangasu, Rimenze, Bazungua, Makpandu, Nadiangere, Kua Diko, Ri-Rangu, Nabiapai, Gangura, Birisi, Ndoromo, Bangazagino, Sangua, Basukangbi Ringasi, Diabio, Yangiri, Ri-Kwangba, Bafuka, Naandi, Andari, Ri-Yubu, Mopai and Sakure.

Governor of Western Equatoria 
 1976 – 1982: H.E Barnaba Kisanga
 1982 – 1984: H.E Charles Ali Bilal
 1984 – 1984: H.E Samuel Abu-John Kabbashi **Lasted 7 days only on first term**
 1984 – 1985: H.E James Bazia
 1985 – 1987: H.E Brig. Dominic Kassiano Dombo
 1987 – 1989: H.E Raphael Zamoi
 1989 – 1991: H.E Brig. Dominic Dabi Monango
 1994 – 2005: ***Due to war in the state, multiple Commissioners/Governors Governed based in Khartoum, Sudan***
 2005: H.E Maj. General Patrick Zamoi **Lasted 6–7 months only on first term**
 2005 – 2008: H.E Samuel Abu-John Kabbashi *Died in office*
 2008 – 2010: H.E Jemma Nunu Kumba
 2010 – 2015: H.E Col. Joseph B. Bakosoro
 2015: H.E Maj. General Patrick Zamoi *Served until the state was divided into multiple states, then served as Governor of Tombura State until Western Equatoria State was restored back to a single state*
 2015–2020: **State broken up; 6 successor state governors**
 2020 – present: H.E Maj. General Alfred Futiyo Karaba

Economy and demographics 

The economy of Western Equatoria is largely agricultural, with high-quality timber being one of its most important products.

Western Equatoria region is the home of the Moru people, the second largest tribes in South Sudan, the
Zande, Baka, Avukaya, Bare, Bongo and Jur tribes.

See also 
 Central Equatoria
 Eastern Equatoria
 Equatoria

References

External links 
South Sudan Internet radio
 Equatorians Abroad
 Video of Equatorians Abroad

Western Equatoria
States of South Sudan